Miner.hu was a vertical search engine for searching blogs, videos and other Hungarian content on the internet. As of May 2008, Miner.hu indexes about 167,000 blogs, and knows about 8,100,000 blog entries and about 1,300,000 videos which makes it the largest Hungarian blogsearch and video search engine. Miner.hu was founded by András Bártházi of Wish Internet Consulting.

As of May 2008, Miner.hu has a blog search engine (with 7 specialized search engine and aggregator about gastro, web development, online marketing, movie/series, fashion, librarian, medical and photo blogs), a video search engine, a Twitter search engine (reduced to Hungarian posts). Miner.hu also has a "Trends" page, which shows the actual topics in the Hungarian blogosphere.

The service has an API, too, developers can create mashups based on different kind of search queries.

Discontinued as the site was dead.

External links
Miner.hu's Own Blog
Miner.hu Blog Trends
Roovet Search Engine

Blog search engines